My Nemesis is a 2023 novel by American writer Charmaine Craig.

Writing and composition
Craig did not create an outline to write the book, but while writing did aim to produce a work of approximately 50,000 words. After selling the book, Craig removed some 3000 words from the work.

Reception
My Nemesis received generally positive reception upon release. Kirkus and Publisher's Weekly both published reviews characterized by literary review aggregator Book Marks as "Positive". In a review published by the Star Tribune, Marion Winik praised the novel as a "spiky little feminist page-turner". The New York Times and The Wall Street Journal both criticized the narrative.

References

2023 American novels
Grove Press books
Novels set in the United States
English-language novels